Laemolyta is a genus of headstander found in the Orinoco and Amazon Basins in South America.

Species
There are currently nine recognized species in this genus:
Laemolyta fasciata N. E. Pearson, 1924
Laemolyta fernandezi G. S. Myers, 1950
Laemolyta garmani (Borodin, 1931)
Laemolyta macra Géry, 1974
Laemolyta nitens (Garman, 1890)
Laemolyta orinocensis (Steindachner, 1879)
Laemolyta proxima (Garman, 1890)
Laemolyta taeniata (Kner, 1858)
Laemolyta varia (Garman, 1890)

References

Anostomidae
Taxa named by Edward Drinker Cope
Fish of South America